Christopher Jorebon Loeak  (born 11 November 1952) is a Marshallese politician who was the President of the Marshall Islands from 2012 to 2016. He was elected by parliament as President in January 2012, following the 2011 general election.

Personal life
Loeak was born on the Ailinglaplap Atoll on 11 November 1952. He attended Marshall Islands High School before traveling to the United States to study at the Hawaii Pacific College and Gonzaga University School of Law. Loeak is a native speaker of Marshallese and also speaks English. He is married to Anono Lieom Loeak and has three children and eight grandchildren.

Political career
Loeak was first elected to the Nitijela in 1985 when he represented the Ailinglaplap Atoll.  He served in the cabinet of President Amata Kabua as Minister of Justice from 1988 to 1992. He became Minister of Social Services in 1992 and held that post until 1996 when Kunio Lemari became acting president on the death of Kabua and Loeak became Minister of Education. He held the education portfolio for two years, continuing his cabinet work under President Imata Kabua who was sworn in during 1997. Kabua made him Minister for the Ralik Chain of islands in 1998, holding that position for a year and also undertaking an additional portfolio as Minister-in-Assistance to the President in 1999.

During his time in the Nitijela Loeak took an active part in many of its committees including those for the Judiciary and Government Relations; Public Account, Health and Education and Social Services (which he chaired); Foreign Affairs and Trade; Appropriation; Resource and Development; International Protection, Peace, Security and Protection of the Environment. He was also a member of the Second and Third Constitutional Conventions, serving as vice-president of the latter, and chaired the Bill of Rights Committee. Loeak was part of the team that negotiated the extension of the United States lease of the Marshallese part of the Ronald Reagan Ballistic Missile Defense Test Site after an eight-year deadlock on talks. The Marshall Islands government agreed to accept payment of $32 million in return for extending the lease on the site.

Loeak was re-elected to the Nitijela in 2007 and has held the seat of Ailinglaplap since then. He re-entered the cabinet in 2008 as Minister-in-Assistance to President Litokwa Tomeing.

President

Loeak became president of the Marshall Islands in January 2012 when the Nitijela elected him to that post. Loeak was elected as presidential candidate by default when former President Kessai Note refused to elect Aelon Kein Ad chosen nominee Tony Debrum who had won the primary. Loeak was thus chosen as second choice to keep the majority. Loeak defeated incumbent president Jurelang Zedkaia by 21 votes to 11. Zedkaia has agreed to co-operate with the new administration and Loeak was expected to name his cabinet and be sworn in within a week.

On 26 September 2013, Christoper Loeak made a speech to the General Debate of the 68th Session of the United Nations General Assembly and said:

Global efforts on climate change are falling short - and low-lying island nations such as mine are already paying the earliest costs of what is fast becoming a global crisis. In every sense, the world must build for future risks, and too often, we are still setting course for current conditions. It is the seas that are rising - not the islands that are sinking. I will not concede my own land or my nation; but nor will I rest until my fellow world leaders have signed onto to act, not just out of economic convenience, but out of a common responsibility of all to strive for upward momentum.

After presidency
Loeak was appointed as the Minister in Assistance to the President by President David Kabua in January 2020.

References

External links
 Statement by Christopher Loeak, President of the Marshall Islands to the Sixty-seventh session of the United Nations General Assembly, 25 September 2012

1952 births
Living people
Presidents of the Marshall Islands
Ministers in Assistance to the President of Marshall Islands
Education ministers of the Marshall Islands
Environment ministers of the Marshall Islands
Justice ministers of the Marshall Islands
Social affairs ministers of the Marshall Islands
Members of the Legislature of the Marshall Islands
People from the Ralik Chain
Gonzaga University School of Law alumni
Hawaii Pacific University alumni
21st-century Marshallese politicians
Climate activists